Valiant may refer to:

People

 James Valiant (1884–1917), English cricketer
 The Valiant Brothers, a professional wrestling tag team of storyline brothers
 Jerry Valiant, a ring name of professional wrestler John Hill (1941-2010)
 Jimmy Valiant, a ring name of professional wrestler James Harold Fanning (born 1942)
 Johnny Valiant, a ring name of professional wrestler Thomas Sullivan (1946–2018)
 Leslie Valiant (born 1949), British computer scientist and computational theorist
 Valiant Swart, South African Akrifaans folk singer born Pierre Nolte in 1965

Fictional characters
 Valiant (Caminhos do Coração), a character in the Brazilian soap opera Caminhos do Coração
 Valiant, the title character of the comic strip Prince Valiant
 Eddie Valiant, one of the main characters in Who Censored Roger Rabbit? and its film adaptation, Who Framed Roger Rabbit

Places 
 Valiants Memorial, a military memorial in Ottawa, Ontario, Canada

Military 
 , various Royal Navy ships
 , the first fully British class of nuclear fleet submarines
 Valiant-class ship of the line, two Royal Navy sailing ships
 , various United States Navy ships
 , a United States Coast Guard cutter
 Valiant-class harbor tug, a class of US Navy yard tugboats that entered service in 2009
 Valiant tank, a British Second World War tank design
 Vickers 131 Valiant, a British biplane bomber
 Vickers Valiant, a British jet bomber
 Vultee BT-13 Valiant, a World War II-era basic trainer aircraft built by Vultee Aircraft for the United States Army Air Corps
 Project Valiant, a cancelled Indian secret ballistic missile project

Vehicles 
 , a customs cutter of the UK Border Agency

 Plymouth Valiant, an automobile manufactured by the Plymouth division of Chrysler Corporation from 1960 to 1976
 Chrysler Valiant, an automobile manufactured by Chrysler Australia from 1962 to 1981
 Velocette Valiant, a British motorcycle made by Velocette

Fictional vehicles
 USS Valiant, the initial but discarded name of USS Defiant, in the Star Trek: Deep Space Nine series
 USS Valiant, a spaceship in the Star Trek second pilot episode "Where No Man Has Gone Before"

Film  
 The Valiant (1929 film), a part-talkie movie starring Paul Muni
 The Valiant (1962 film), directed by Roy Ward Baker
 Valiant (film), a 2005 film about British homing pigeons

Television 
 "Valiant" (Merlin), second episode of the British television series Merlin
 "Valiant" (Star Trek: Deep Space Nine), an episode of the American television series Star Trek: Deep Space Nine and a starship in the episode

Music 
 Vince Vance & the Valiants, an American country pop and rock and roll musical group
 Valiant Records, a 1960s independent record label acquired in 1965 by Warner Bros.

Literature 
 Valiant Comics, a comic book publisher
 Valiant (comics), British comic published between 1962 and 1976
 Valiant: A Modern Tale of Faerie, a 2005 urban fantasy novel by Holly Black

Other uses 
 The Valiant (play), a 1924 one-act stage play
 The Valiants, nickname of the British football club Port Vale F.C.
 Los Angeles Valiant, professional esports team of the Overwatch League

See also 

 
 
 The Valiant Sixty, a group of early Quaker leaders and activists in the latter part of the 17th century